Stachys annua, called the annual yellow woundwort, is a widespread species of flowering plant in the hedgenettle genus Stachys, native to Europe, the Middle East, and western Siberia, and introduced in Cyprus, eastern North America, and Amur Oblast and Primorsky Krai in far eastern Russia. It is a common plant in fields, road verges and waste places.

Subspecies
The following subspecies are currently accepted:

Stachys annua subsp. ammophila (Boiss. & Blanche) Sam.
Stachys annua subsp. annua
Stachys annua subsp. cilicica (Boiss.) R.Bhattacharjee

References

annua
Taxa named by Carl Linnaeus
Plants described in 1763